Eugene Edward Schmitz (August 22, 1864 – November 20, 1928), often referenced as "Handsome Gene" Schmitz, was an American musician and politician, the 26th mayor of San Francisco (1902-7), who was in office during the 1906 San Francisco earthquake.

Early life 

Born in San Francisco, Schmitz was the son of an Irish mother and a German father.

Career 
He played the violin and conducted the orchestra at the Columbia Theatre on Powell Street in San Francisco.

He was president of the Musicians' Union, when city boss Abe Ruef chose him to run for mayor of his hometown on the ticket of the Union Labor Party. Schmitz was elected on November 7, 1901, thereafter giving protection to criminals, including houses of prostitution for protection money, while remaining popular with the working class. Despite opposition from a reform candidate backed by a fusion party, he was reelected in 1903 and 1905, each time by wide majorities. In 1905, Schmitz won by a very large vote, receiving 40,191, whereas only 28,687 were cast for John S. Partridge.

1906 earthquake 
He was still mayor when the 1906 San Francisco earthquake and subsequent fire destroyed a prodigious amount of the city.  On the day of the earthquake, Wednesday, April 18, 1906, he invited a cross-section of the city's most prominent businessmen, politicians and civic leaders, but none of the members of the Board of Supervisors, to form the Committee of Fifty to help him manage the crisis.

Mayor Schmitz said "The federal troops, which are now policing a portion of the city, as well as the regular and special members of the police force, have been authorized by me to kill any persons whomsoever, found engaged in looting the effects of any citizen or otherwise engaged in the commission of crime." seen as a predecessor to the sentiment "when the looting starts, the shooting starts."

Bribery scandal 
On June 13, 1907, Schmitz was found guilty of extortion and bribery. The bribery scandal was one of the many San Francisco graft trials, which included Schmitz, Tirey L. Ford, and attorney Abe Ruef, who were receiving bribes. The office of mayor was declared vacant while he was sent to jail to await sentence.  Shortly thereafter, he was sentenced to five years at San Quentin State Prison, the maximum sentence the law allowed.  He immediately appealed; while awaiting the outcome, he was kept in a cell in San Francisco County Jail.

On January 9, 1908, the District Court of Appeals nullified his conviction.  Two months later, the California Supreme Court upheld the Court of Appeals' ruling, and he was released on bail pending the resolution of the outstanding bribery indictments.  In 1912, he was brought to trial once more, this time on charges of bribery; however, after Abe Ruef was brought from San Quentin to testify and refused to give evidence, and the other key witness, Chief Supervisor James L. Gallagher, fled to Canada, Schmitz was acquitted.

Schmitz ran for mayor again in 1915 and 1919, but was soundly defeated due to his past reputation. Elected to the Board of Supervisors in 1921, he remained until 1925.

Personal life 
He married Julia Driscoll on June 10, 1891 in Watsonville, California and had two daughters.

Literature
 New International Yearbook for 1907 and 1908
 George Kennan, "The Fight for Reform in San Francisco," McClure's, Sept. 1907 & Nov. 1907.

References

External links

Schmitz' "Shoot to kill" order at the Virtual Museum of the City of San Francisco
1907 editorial cartoon from the San Francisco Examiner
Photographs related to the San Francisco graft trial, 1907–1908, The Bancroft Library

1864 births
1928 deaths
1906 San Francisco earthquake
American people of Irish descent
American people of German descent
American violinists
American Roman Catholics
American male violinists
Burials at Holy Cross Cemetery (Colma, California)
History of San Francisco
Mayors of San Francisco
American conductors (music)
American male conductors (music)
San Francisco Board of Supervisors members